is a Japanese former Nippon Professional Baseball infielder.

References 

1970 births
Living people
Baseball people from Saitama Prefecture 
Japanese baseball players
Nippon Professional Baseball infielders
Seibu Lions players
Yakult Swallows players
Tokyo Yakult Swallows players
Baseball players at the 1990 Asian Games
Asian Games competitors for Japan